John Bohn Ebsen Kronborg (born 15 November 1988) is a Danish former professional cyclist, who rode professionally between 2012 and 2018. He still competes as an amateur, notably in the Taiwan KOM Challenge, which he has won five times.

Major results

2012
 1st Taiwan KOM Challenge
 5th Overall Tour of Thailand
1st Mountains classification
 6th Overall Tour de Singkarak
1st Stage 4
2013
 2nd Overall Tour de Ijen
 3rd Overall Tour de Filipinas
 5th Overall Tour de East Java
1st Stage 3
 6th Overall Tour of Borneo
 8th Overall Tour de Langkawi
 9th Melaka Governor's Cup
2014
 1st Miaoli District Club Race
 1st Mount Washington Auto Road Bicycle Hillclimb
 1st Taiwan KOM Challenge
 2nd Overall Tour de East Java
 4th Overall Tour de Filipinas
2017
 1st  Mountains classification Tour de Langkawi
 3rd Taiwan KOM Challenge
2018
 1st Taiwan KOM Challenge
 5th Overall Tour de Filipinas
2019
 8th Taiwan KOM Challenge
2020
 1st Taiwan KOM Challenge
2022
 1st Taiwan KOM Challenge

References

External links

1988 births
Living people
Danish male cyclists